Xingshou Town is a town located in the east end of Changping District, Beijing, China. Bounded by Taihang Mountain Range to its immediate north, Xingshou shares border with Qiaozi and Yanshou Towns in the north, Beishicao and Zhaoquanying Towns in the east, Xiaotangshan Town in the south, and Cuicun Town in the west. It had a total popularion of 34,139 as of 2020.

Xingshou, The name of the town, came from Chongshou Buddhist Temple (崇寿禅寺), also named "Xingshouli" (兴寿里), that was built in the region during the Liao dynasty.

History

Administrative divisions 

As of 2021, Xingshou Town was subdivided 21 villages:

Gallery

See also 

 List of township-level divisions of Beijing

References 

Changping District
Towns in Beijing